Queens Village is a mostly residential middle class neighborhood in the eastern part of the New York City borough of Queens. It is bound by Hollis to the west, Cambria Heights to the south, Bellerose to the east, and Oakland Gardens to the north.

Shopping in the community is located along Braddock Avenue, Hillside Avenue, Hempstead Avenue, and Jamaica Avenue (NY 25), as well as on Springfield Boulevard. Located just east of Queens Village, in Nassau County, is the Belmont Park race track.

Close to the neighborhood are Cunningham Park and Alley Pond Park, as well as the historic Long Island Motor Parkway (LIMP), home of the turn of the century racing competition, the Vanderbilt Cup. The LIMP was built by William Kissam Vanderbilt, a descendant of the family that presided over the New York Central Railroad and Western Union; it is now part of the Brooklyn-Queens Greenway.

Queens Village is located in Queens Community District 13 and its ZIP Codes are 11427, 11428, and 11429. It is patrolled by the New York City Police Department's 105th Precinct. Politically, Queens Village is represented by the New York City Council's 23rd District.

History
Queens Village was founded as Little Plains in the 1640s. Homage to this part of Queens Village history is found on the sign above the Long Island Railroad Station there. In 1824, Thomas Brush established a blacksmith shop in the area. He prospered and built several other shops and a factory, and the area soon became known as Brushville. On March 1, 1837, the railroad arrived. The first station in the area was called Flushing Avenue in 1837, Delancy Avenue by June 20, 1837, and Brushville by November 27, 1837,
likely about a mile west of the present station. In 1856, residents voted to change the name from Brushville to Queens.
The name "Inglewood" also was used for both the village and the train station in the 1860s and 1870s.
The name Brushville was still used in an 1860 New York Times article,
but both "Queens" and "Brushville" are used in an 1870 article.
Maps from 1873 show portions of Queens Village (then called Inglewood and Queens) in the town of Hempstead, but 1891 maps show it entirely in the town of Jamaica.

After the Borough of Queens became incorporated as part of the City of Greater New York in 1898, and the new county of Nassau was created in 1899, the border between the city and Nassau County was set directly east of Queens Village. A 1901 article in the Brooklyn Eagle already uses the full name Queens Village,
a name that had been used as late as the 1880s for Lloyd's Neck in present-day Suffolk County. In 1923, the Long Island Railroad added "Village" to its station's name to avoid confusion with the county of the same name, and thus the neighborhood became known as Queens Village.

Queens Village was part of an overall housing boom that was spreading east through Queens from New York as people from the city sought the bucolic life afforded by the less-crowded atmosphere of the area. Today, many of those charming and well-maintained Dutch Colonial and Tudor homes built in Queens Village during the 1920s and 1930s continue to attract a diverse population.

Other Queens Village on Long Island
Lloyd Harbor, New York, which was formerly in Queens County but now in Suffolk County, was known as Queens Village from 1685 until as late as 1883. In 1885, known then as Lloyd Neck, it seceded from Queens County and became part of the town of Huntington in Suffolk County.

Subsections

Bellaire
Bellaire is in western Queens Village next to Hollis and covers the area surrounding Jamaica Avenue and 211th Street. Bellaire is the largest section of Queens Village. The area considered Bellaire usually falls under the general title of Queens Village. There was once a Long Island Rail Road station named Bellaire. 211th Street, formerly known as Belleaire Boulevard has traffic medians on it indicating its history as the main route through this section of Queens Village.

Hollis Hills
Hollis Hills is an affluent subsection, generally bounded by Springfield Boulevard to the east, Grand Central Parkway the south, Hollis Hills Terrace to the west, and Kingsbury Avenue and Richland Avenue the north. It is slightly above sea level due to a retreating glacier from the last Ice Age. A small pond called Potamogeton Pond exists at Bell Boulevard on the north side of Grand Central Parkway.

Most homes in Hollis Hills are of the Colonial, Tudor, and Ranch styles. Houses here attract predominantly the upper-middle class as some houses in the area can fetch prices of $1,500,000 or higher. This neighborhood, similar to Douglaston, is a quasi-suburb, with detached homes sitting on large tree-lined lots. Surrey Estates, a section of Hollis Hills, is a smaller triangle of architecturally notable homes surrounded by old, large trees and is bound by Union Turnpike, Springfield Boulevard, and Hartland Avenue within Hollis Hills.

Notable institutions in Hollis Hills are The Chapel of the Redeemer Lutheran, Hollis Hills Jewish Center (founded in 1948), American Martyrs Catholic Church, the Windsor Park Branch of the Queens Public Library, the John Hamburg Community Center, Kingsbury Elementary School (P.S. 188), Hollis Hills Civic Association, and Surrey Estates Homeowners Association.

Demographics
Queens Village, like many parts of Queens, is diverse. The neighborhood is mainly Caribbean American, Guyanese, Hispanic, Indian, Filipino, and Jamaican people also have significant populations among the 48,670 people living within the area. Formerly, a very large Jewish community existed. However, many Jewish families have left for other parts of Queens and parts of Long Island. Still, there is a small Jewish presence in Queens Village that has recently been augmented by an increase of Middle Eastern Jews. There has also been an increase in the number of Asian American residents.

Based on data from the 2010 United States Census, the population of Queens Village was 52,504, a decrease of 5,200 (9.0%) from the 57,704 counted in 2000.

The racial makeup of the neighborhood was 50.2% (26,376) African American, 16.0% (8,424) Asian, 6.3% (3,304) White, 0.5% (279) Native American, 0.1% (64) Pacific Islander, 3.9% (2,066) from other races and 4.4% (2,320) from two or more races. Hispanic or Latino of any race were 18.4% (9,671) of the population.

The entirety of Community Board 13, which mainly comprises Queens Village but also includes other areas, had 193,787 inhabitants as of NYC Health's 2018 Community Health Profile, with an average life expectancy of 82.9 years. This is higher than the median life expectancy of 81.2 for all New York City neighborhoods. Most inhabitants are youth and middle-aged adults: 20% are between the ages of between 0–17, 26% between 25–44, and 29% between 45–64. The ratio of college-aged and elderly residents was lower, at 9% and 16% respectively.

As of 2017, the median household income in Community Board 13 was $85,857. In 2018, an estimated 13% of Queens Village residents lived in poverty, compared to 19% in all of Queens and 20% in all of New York City. One in twelve residents (8%) were unemployed, compared to 8% in Queens and 9% in New York City. Rent burden, or the percentage of residents who have difficulty paying their rent, is 50% in Queens Village, lower than the boroughwide and citywide rates of 53% and 51% respectively. Based on this calculation, Queens Village are considered to be high-income relative to the rest of the city and not gentrifying.

Police and crime
Queens Village is patrolled by the 105th Precinct of the NYPD, located at 92-08 222nd Street. The 105th Precinct ranked 17th safest out of 69 patrol areas for per-capita crime in 2010. , with a non-fatal assault rate of 29 per 100,000 people, Queens Village's rate of violent crimes per capita is less than that of the city as a whole. The incarceration rate of 378 per 100,000 people is lower than that of the city as a whole.

The 105th Precinct has a lower crime rate than in the 1990s, with crimes across all categories having decreased by 79.4% between 1990 and 2018. The precinct reported 9 murders, 24 rapes, 197 robberies, 405 felony assaults, 266 burglaries, 589 grand larcenies, and 164 grand larcenies auto in 2018.

Fire safety
Queens Village contains a New York City Fire Department (FDNY) fire station, Engine Co. 304/Ladder Co. 162, at 218-44 97th Avenue.

Health
, preterm births are more common in Queens Village than in other places citywide, though births to teenage mothers are less common. In Queens Village, there were 111 preterm births per 1,000 live births (compared to 87 per 1,000 citywide), and 8.8 births to teenage mothers per 1,000 live births (compared to 19.3 per 1,000 citywide). Queens Village has an about-average population of residents who are uninsured. In 2018, this population of uninsured residents was estimated to be 11%, about the same as the citywide rate of 12%.

Twelve percent of Queens Village residents are smokers, which is lower than the city average of 14% of residents being smokers. In Queens Village, 27% of residents are obese, 14% are diabetic, and 37% have high blood pressure—compared to the citywide averages of 22%, 8%, and 23% respectively. In addition, 20% of children are obese, compared to the citywide average of 20%.

Eighty-six percent of residents eat some fruits and vegetables every day, which is slightly less than the city's average of 87%. In 2018, 74% of residents described their health as "good," "very good," or "excellent," lower than the city's average of 78%. For every supermarket in Queens Village, there are 14 bodegas.

The nearest major hospitals are Jamaica Hospital and Queens Hospital Center, both located in Jamaica.

Post offices and ZIP Codes
Queens Village is covered by 3 ZIP Codes. From north to south they are 11427 north of 90th Avenue, 11428 between 90th and 99th Avenues, and 11429 between 99th and 114th Avenues. The United States Post Office operates one post office nearby: the Queens Village Station at 209-20 Jamaica Avenue.

Education 
Queens Village generally has a similar rate of college-educated residents to the rest of the city . While 38% of residents age 25 and older have a college education or higher, 13% have less than a high school education and 49% are high school graduates or have some college education. By contrast, 39% of Queens residents and 43% of city residents have a college education or higher. The percentage of Queens Village students excelling in math rose from 42% in 2000 to 59% in 2011, and reading achievement decreased slightly from 52% to 50% during the same time period.

Queens Village's rate of elementary school student absenteeism is less than the rest of New York City. In Queens Village, 15% of elementary school students missed twenty or more days per school year, lower than the citywide average of 20%. Additionally, 83% of high school students in Queens Village graduate on time, higher than the citywide average of 75%.

Schools
Public schools in Queens Village are operated by the New York City Department of Education and include the following:
 P.S. 018 The Winchester School
 P.S./I.S. 295
 P.S. 33 Edward M Funk School
 P.S. 95 Eastwood School
 I.S. 109 Jean Nuzzi Intermediate School
 M.S 172 Irwin Altman 
 Queens Gateway to Health Sciences Secondary School
 P.S. 034 John Harvard School
 P.S. 135 The Bellaire School
 P.S.188
 Martin Van Buren High School

Private schools include:
 Saints Joachim and Anne School
 Grace Lutheran Day School
 St. Joseph's Episcopal Day School
 Incarnation R.C. School

Library
The Queens Public Library operates the Queens Village branch at 94-11 217th Street.

Transportation

Queens Village station, located at Amboy Lane (on the corner of Springfield Boulevard and Jamaica Avenue), offers service on the Long Island Rail Road's Hempstead Branch.

Though no New York City Subway stations serve Queens Village, there are several bus routes that connect to the subway, including MTA Regional Bus Operations' , and Nassau Inter-County Express'  routes. In addition, the MTA's  express bus runs directly to Manhattan.

Queens Village is served by intercity buses operated by Greyhound, Short Line, and Adirondack Trailways. These buses stop near the intersection of Hillside Avenue and Springfield Boulevard.

Notable residents
George Gately (1928–2001), creator of the Heathcliff comic strip
 Nancy Malone (1935-2014), actor, director, producer, television executive
Charles Henry Miller (1842–1922), landscape painter
Paul Newman (1925-2008), actor, from 1953-54
 The Rockin' Chairs, a doo-wop group in the 1950s
Tevi Troy, Deputy Secretary of the United States Department of Health and Human Services
 Melvyn Weiss (1935-2018), attorney who co-founded the plaintiff class action law firm Milberg Weiss.

References

Further reading
1852 Brooklyn Eagle article - Take the LIRR to Picnic to Brushville
1871 Brooklyn Eagle article - Opening of new station at Inglewood, and Land sale by Colonel Wood
1900 Brooklyn Eagle article - proposed new LIRR station at Brushville—between Hollis and Queens (Village)
If You're Thinking of Living in: Queens Village - Strong Community Ties, Moderate Prices

Neighborhoods in Queens, New York